Poste Airport  is an airport serving Obo, a town in the Haut-Mbomou prefecture of the Central African Republic. The airport is on the northwest corner of the town.

See also

Transport in the Central African Republic
List of airports in the Central African Republic

References

External links 
OpenStreetMap - Obo
OurAirports - Poste Airport
FallingRain - Poste Airport

Airports in the Central African Republic
Buildings and structures in Haut-Mbomou